Philome Laguerre (born 17 January 1933) is a Haitian weightlifter. He competed in the men's middle heavyweight event at the 1960 Summer Olympics.

References

1933 births
Living people
Haitian male weightlifters
Olympic weightlifters of Haiti
Weightlifters at the 1960 Summer Olympics
People from Cap-Haïtien
Pan American Games medalists in weightlifting
Pan American Games silver medalists for Haiti
Weightlifters at the 1959 Pan American Games
20th-century Haitian people
21st-century Haitian people